Paduka Sri Sultan Mudzaffar Shah I, (died 27 July 1179) styled Phra Ong Mahawangsa was a legendary king and was said to be the first Sultan of Kedah, according to Hikayat Merong Mahawangsa. He was the last Hindu king of Kedah, styled Sri Paduka Maharaja Durbar Raja before his accession. After his conversion to Islam, he later became the founder of the Kedah Sultanate.

See also
 Merong Mahawangsa

References

External links
 List of Sultans of Kedah

1179 deaths
Year of birth unknown
12th-century Sultans of Kedah
Founding monarchs